Henriette von Crayen (November 1, 1755 – February 26, 1832), was a German salonist and noble. She held one of the most famous salons of contemporary Germany in Leipzig and Berlin. She was also famous for her many love affairs with a great number of famous people.

References 
 Joachim Kühn: Die schöne Frau von Crayen und die Ihren. Ein Nachwort zu Fontanes "Schach von Wuthenow". In: Der Bär von Berlin. Vol. 21, 1972, pp. 89–109.
 Petra Wilhelmy: Der Berliner Salon im 19. Jahrhundert. Walter de Gruyter, Berlin 1989, pp. 55–57, 486–88 and 626–28.
 Petra Wilhelmy-Dollinger: Die Berliner Salons. Mit historischen Spaziergängen. Walter de Gruyter, Berlin 2000.

1755 births
1832 deaths
18th-century German people
German salon-holders